Two Leaves and a Bud manufactures and distributes organic tea. Based in Basalt, Colorado, Two Leaves and a Bud produces organic whole leaf tea that is packaged in pyramid-shaped sachets.

History 
Richard Rosenfeld founded Two Leaves and a Bud in the mid 2000s. The company sources black, green, white, and herbal teas from tea growers primarily in China and India.

Organic tea 
Two Leaves and a Bud produces whole leaf tea sachets and loose leaf teas that are certified USDA organic.

Awards
During the 2012 North American Tea Championships, Two leaves and a Bud's Jasmine Petal tea took first place, and in the 2013 Championships, their Paisley Brand Organic Chai took second place.

References

External links 
 

Tea brands in the United States
Tea companies of the United States
Fair trade brands
Organic farming organizations
American companies established in 2005
Food and drink companies established in 2005
Agriculture companies established in 2005